Rear Admiral Geoffrey Mawuli Biekro (born 28 August 1952)  is a Ghanaian Military Officer. He served as the Chief of Naval Staff from March 2013 to January 2016. His appointment to the position was done after Vice Admiral Matthew Quashie was elevated to Chief of Defence Staff .

References

Living people
1952 births
Ghanaian military personnel
Ghana Navy personnel
University of Ghana alumni
Chiefs of Naval Staff (Ghana)